The Venturing Summit is the highest rank for youth in the Venturing program of the Boy Scouts of America.  It requires Venturers to earn the Pathfinder Rank, participate in adventures, and demonstrate leadership, service and personal growth.

Rank
This rank consists of three elements: a badge, a medal and a knot insignia.

The badge is a rotated square cloth patch, with the Venturing Summit rank emblem and the words LEAD THE ADVENTURE above. The badge is worn on the left pocket by youth have earned the rank

The medal is an antique silver colored roundel with the words LEAD THE ADVENTURE in the border. The inner border is inscribed with a compass rose. Superimposed on the roundel is a silver eagle in flight with the Venturing emblem below. The medal is suspended from a white ribbon with green stripes; the ribbon is suspended from an antique silver colored bar bearing the word SUMMIT. The design incorporates elements from the Exploring Silver Medal (Type II) issued between 1954 and 1965. The medal is worn on formal occasions, such as a Court of Honor.

The square knot insignia is a rectangular cloth patch with a silver knot and border on a green and white background. This is the same knot previously used for the Silver Award. The knot is to be worn above the left pocket by adults who achieved the Summit award while they were a youth. No youth can wear this knot on any uniform, instead they wear the rank patch and/or the medal.

History 
The Summit Award replaced the Silver Award on June 1, 2014, with the Silver Award discontinued as of December 31, 2014. The first presentation of the Summit Award was on February 16, 2015 by former BSA National President, Wayne Perry. 

In August 2020 the Venturing Summit Award was formally recognized as a Rank that Venturers can earn through a series of requirements.

Requirements

Adventure

Leadership

Service

Personal growth

Silver Award 

The Silver Award was the highest award in the Venturing program of the Boy Scouts of America from 1998 through 2014.  It required Venturers to first earn one of five Bronze Awards, earn the Gold Award, have one year's tenure in a crew, and fulfill requirements relating to emergency preparedness, leadership skills, and ethics-in-action. The Silver Award was replaced by the Summit Award starting in 2014 and was discontinued on January 1, 2015.

Award
The award consisted of a medal suspended from a white ribbon with green stripes; the ribbon is suspended from an antique silver colored bar bearing the word VENTURING.  The medal is an antique silver colored roundel with red, white and blue enameled stripes, the universal Boy Scout logo at the top with a superimposed eagle in flight, and the words VENTURING SILVER in the border.

Recipients may wear the corresponding square knot insignia, with a silver knot and border on a green and white background on the BSA uniform.

Origins
The original Silver Award was first issued from 1949 to 1954 as part of the BSA's Explorer program.  The award was restyled in 1954 and awarded through 1958 when Explorer was renamed to Exploring and advancement was dropped.  Air Explorers continued to be able to earn this award through 1964.  A total of 18,047 Explorers earned the Silver Award between 1949 and 1958.

The award was re-introduced in 1998 as part of Venturing and its current design is similar to its historic counterpart.

Purpose
The purpose of the Silver Award was to:
 Provide a pathway for personal development.
 Encourage Venturers to learn, grow and serve.
 Recognize the high level of achievement of Venturers who acquire Venturing skills.
 Identify trained and highly motivated Venturers who will be a training, leadership, and program resource for other Venturers, Scouts, organizations, and the community.
 Help define Venturing.

Highest awards in other programs

The highest awards in other BSA membership divisions are the Cub Scouting Arrow of Light, the Scouts BSA Eagle Scout, the Sea Scouting Quartermaster Award, and the Varsity Scouting Denali Award. Using the United States Military as the model, silver awards are higher than gold awards in the BSA. Other Scouting movements have similar programs and awards.

See also
 Advancement and recognition in the Boy Scouts of America

References

Advancement and recognition in the Boy Scouts of America